Eilema quadrisignata is a moth of the subfamily Arctiinae first described by Frederic Moore in 1878. It is found in the Indian state of Sikkim.

References

quadrisignata